Jacks Creek is a  long tributary of the Bruneau River in Owyhee County, Idaho. It was named after Jack Turner, a rancher who settled the area in 1869.

See also
List of rivers of Idaho

References

Rivers of Owyhee County, Idaho
Rivers of Idaho